The Kerry-Offaly rivalry is a Gaelic football rivalry between Irish county teams Kerry and Offaly, who first played each other in 1969. It was considered to be one of the biggest rivalries in Gaelic games during the 1980s. Kerry's home ground is Fitzgerald Stadium and Offaly's home ground is O'Connor Park, however, all of their championship meetings have been held at neutral venues, usually Croke Park.

While Kerry have the highest number of Munster titles and Offaly lie in fourth position behind Dublin, Meath and Kildare on the roll of honour in Leinster, they have also enjoyed success in the All-Ireland Senior Football Championship, having won 40 championship titles between them to date.

All-time results

Legend

Senior

References

Offaly
Offaly county football team rivalries